Itu is a Romanian surname. Notable people with the surname include:

Cornel Itu (born 1955), Romanian politician
Ion Itu (1935–2006), Romanian literary critic and essayist
Lucian Itu (born 1978), Romanian footballer 

Romanian-language surnames